The 2007–08 Philadelphia Flyers season was the Flyers' 41st season in the National Hockey League (NHL). The Flyers went from the worst team in the league during the previous season to the Eastern Conference Finals, losing to the Pittsburgh Penguins in five games.

Off-season
In June, the Flyers made a trade which sent the first round draft pick they had acquired in the Peter Forsberg trade (23rd overall) back to the Nashville Predators for the rights to negotiate with impending unrestricted free agents Kimmo Timonen and Scott Hartnell. Both were signed to six-year contracts.

Due to having the NHL's worst record during the 2006–07 season, the Flyers had the best chance to claim the first overall pick in the draft lottery. However, the Chicago Blackhawks won the lottery and jumped up to the first overall selection, relegating the Flyers to the 2nd overall pick. After much speculation as to whether the Flyers would trade the pick in the 2007 NHL Entry Draft, the Flyers stayed put and selected New Jersey native James van Riemsdyk.

The Flyers wasted no time in addressing their free agent needs. On July 1, the Flyers signed Buffalo Sabres center Danny Briere to an eight-year, $52 million contract. Continuing to revamp their defensive core, defenseman Joni Pitkanen and forward Geoff Sanderson were traded to the Edmonton Oilers for defenseman Jason Smith and forward Joffrey Lupul. Smith was named Flyers captain on October 1.

Regular season
The season began in the image of the Broad Street Bullies era, with multiple-game suspensions handed out to five separate players, the most serious being 20- and 25-game suspensions to Steve Downie and Jesse Boulerice, respectively, for two separate incidents. A 7–3 start in October and a 9–3–1 January run had the Flyers near the top of both the division and conference standings. However, a disastrous ten-game losing streak in February, reminiscent of such a streak the previous season, nearly derailed the Flyers' season. An 8–3–4 run in March coupled with two vital wins over the New Jersey Devils and the Pittsburgh Penguins over the final weekend of the regular season put the Flyers back in the playoffs as the sixth seed and set for a first round matchup with the Washington Capitals.

Divisional standings

Conference standings

Playoffs
After taking a three games to one series lead over Washington, the Capitals won Games 5 and 6 to force a Game 7 in Washington. The Flyers won the series in overtime on Joffrey Lupul's power play goal. The Flyers then drew a matchup with the heavily-favored Montreal Canadiens in the second round. Despite being outshot the majority of the series, the Flyers upset Montreal in five games and advanced to the Eastern Conference Finals for the first time since 2003–04 to face the Pittsburgh Penguins. Before the start of the series, the Flyers suffered a fatal blow when it was learned that defenseman Kimmo Timonen was out with a blood clot in his ankle. Coupled with a gruesome facial injury to Braydon Coburn in Game 2, Pittsburgh ran roughshod over the Flyers' depleted defense and jumped out to a 3–0 series lead. The Flyers won Game 4 at home to stave off elimination, and although Timonen returned for Game 5, Pittsburgh finished off the Flyers in five games.

Schedule and results

Preseason

|- style="background:#cfc;"
| 1 || September 17 || @ New Jersey Devils || 3–2 || 4,615 || 1–0–0 ||
|- style="background:#fcf;"
| 2 || September 18 || Ottawa Senators || 0–4 || 9,100 || 1–1–0 ||
|- style="background:#cfc;"
| 3 || September 22 || @ New York Rangers || 5–0 || 12,500 || 2–1–0 ||
|- style="background:#fcf;"
| 4 || September 24 || New Jersey Devils || 1–3|| 16,572 || 2–2–0 ||
|- style="background:#fcf;"
| 5 || September 25 || @ Ottawa Senators || 2–4 || 18,053 || 2–3–0 ||
|- style="background:#cfc;"
| 6 || September 26 || Washington Capitals || 2–1 || 16,327 || 3–3–0 ||
|- style="background:#fcf;"
| 7 || September 28 || @ Washington Capitals || 5–7 || 10,409 || 3–4–0 ||
|- style="background:#fcf;"
| 8 || September 29 || New York Rangers || 2–3 || 17,911 || 3–5–0 ||
|-
| colspan="7" style="text-align:center;"|
Notes:
 Game played at Sovereign Bank Arena in Trenton, New Jersey.
 Game played at John Labatt Centre in London, Ontario.
|-

|-
| Legend:

Regular season

|- style="background:#cfc;"
| 1 || October 4 || Philadelphia || 3–2 || Calgary ||  || Biron || 19,289 || 1–0–0 || 2 || 
|- style="background:#fcf;"
| 2 || October 6 || Philadelphia || 3–5 || Edmonton || || Biron || 16,839 || 1–1–0 || 2 || 
|- style="background:#cfc;"
| 3 || October 10 || Philadelphia || 8–2 || Vancouver || || Biron || 18,630 || 2–1–0 || 4 || 
|- style="background:#cfc;"
| 4 || October 13 || NY Islanders || 1–3 || Philadelphia ||  || Biron || 19,714 ||  3–1–0 || 6 || 
|- style="background:#cfc;"
| 5 || October 16 || Atlanta || 0–4 || Philadelphia ||  || Biron || 18,933 || 4–1–0 || 8 || 
|- style="background:#cfc;"
| 6 || October 18 || New Jersey || 0–4 || Philadelphia || || Biron || 19,113 || 5–1–0 || 10 || 
|- style="background:#cfc;"
| 7 || October 20 || Carolina || 2–3 || Philadelphia || OT || Biron || 19,615 || 6–1–0 || 12 || 
|- style="background:#fcf;"
| 8 || October 24 || Philadelphia || 3–4 || Florida || || Biron || 12,856 || 6–2–0 || 12 || 
|- style="background:#fcf;"
| 9 || October 25 || Philadelphia || 2–5 || Tampa Bay || || Niittymaki || 18,616 || 6–3–0 || 12 || 
|- style="background:#cfc;"
| 10 || October 27 || Philadelphia || 2–1 || Boston || || Biron || 14,956 || 7–3–0 || 14 || 
|-

|- style="background:#fcf;"
| 11 || November 1 || Philadelphia || 2–5 || Montreal || || Biron || 21,173 || 7–4–0 || 14 || 
|- style="background:#cfc;"
| 12 || November 2 || Philadelphia || 3–2 || Washington || || Niittymaki || 16,055 || 8–4–0 || 16 || 
|- style="background:#fcf;"
| 13 || November 5 || Philadelphia || 0–2 || NY Rangers || || Biron ||18,200 || 8–5–0 || 16 || 
|- style="background:#cfc;"
| 14 || November 7 || Philadelphia || 3–1 || Pittsburgh || || Biron || 17,132 || 9–5–0 || 18 || 
|- style="background:#fcf;"
| 15 || November 8 || Philadelphia || 1–4 || New Jersey || || Biron || 14,948 || 9–6–0 || 18 || 
|- style="background:#cfc;"
| 16 || November 10 || Pittsburgh || 2–5 || Philadelphia || || Biron || 19,859 || 10–6–0 || 20 || 
|- style="background:#cfc;"
| 17 || November 12 || NY Islanders || 2–3 || Philadelphia || || Biron || 19,312 || 11–6–0 || 22 || 
|- style="background:#ffc;"
| 18 || November 15 || NY Rangers || 4–3 || Philadelphia || SO || Biron || 19,571 || 11–6–1 || 23 || 
|- style="background:#fcf;"
| 19 || November 17 || New Jersey || 6–2 || Philadelphia || || Biron || 19,621 || 11–7–1 || 23 || 
|- style="background:#cfc;"
| 20 || November 21 || Philadelphia || 6–3 || Carolina || || Biron || 16,351 || 12–7–1 || 25 || 
|- style="background:#ffc;"
| 21 || November 23 || Washington || 4–3 || Philadelphia || OT || Biron || 19,727 || 12–7–2 || 26 || 
|- style="background:#cfc;"
| 22 || November 24 || Philadelphia || 4–3 || Ottawa || || Niittymaki || 20,128 || 13–7–2 || 28 || 
|- style="background:#fcf;"
| 23 || November 26 || Boston || 6–3 || Philadelphia || || Niittymaki || 19,457 || 13–8–2 || 28 || 
|- style="background:#cfc;"
| 24 || November 28 || Philadelphia || 3–1 || Carolina || || Biron || 15,108 || 14–8–2 || 30 || 
|-

|- style="background:#fcf;"
| 25 || December 1 || Dallas || 4–1 || Philadelphia || || Biron || 19,660 || 14–9–2 || 30 || 
|- style="background:#cfc;"
| 26 || December 5 || Philadelphia || 3–1 || Minnesota || || Niittymaki || 18,568 || 15–9–2 || 32 || 
|- style="background:#fcf;"
| 27 || December 7 || Philadelphia || 1–2 || Colorado || || Biron || 16,312 || 15–10–2 || 32 || 
|- style="background:#cfc;"
| 28 || December 11 || Pittsburgh || 2–8 || Philadelphia || || Biron || 19,409 || 16–10–2 || 34 || 
|- style="background:#fcf;"
| 29 || December 13 || Montreal || 4–1 || Philadelphia || || Niittymaki || 19,322 || 16–11–2 || 34 || 
|- style="background:#ffc;"
| 30 || December 15 || Carolina || 6–5 || Philadelphia || SO || Biron || 19,460 || 16–11–3 || 35 || 
|- style="background:#fcf;"
| 31 || December 16 || Philadelphia || 2–4 || New Jersey || || Niittymaki || 16,687 || 16–12–3 || 35 || 
|- style="background:#fcf;"
| 32 || December 18 || Phoenix || 3–2 || Philadelphia || || Biron || 19,211 || 16–13–3 || 35 || 
|- style="background:#fcf;"
| 33 || December 21 || Philadelphia || 2–3 || Buffalo || || Biron || 18,690 || 16–14–3 || 35 || 
|- style="background:#ffc;"
| 34 || December 22 || Buffalo || 6–5 || Philadelphia || SO || Biron || 19,606 || 16–14–4 || 36 || 
|- style="background:#cfc;"
| 35 || December 27 || Toronto || 1–4 || Philadelphia || || Biron || 19,727 || 17–14–4 || 38 || 
|- style="background:#cfc;"
| 36 || December 29 || Philadelphia || 4–2 || Tampa Bay || || Biron || 20,124 || 18–14–4 || 40 || 
|- style="background:#cfc;"
| 37 || December 30 || Philadelphia || 1–0 || Florida || || Niittymaki || 18,767 || 19–14–4 || 42 || 
|-

|- style="background:#fcf;"
| 38 || January 4 || Philadelphia || 0–3 || New Jersey || || Biron || 17,625 || 19–15–4 || 42 || 
|- style="background:#cfc;"
| 39 || January 5 || Philadelphia || 3–2 || Toronto || || Niittymaki || 19,412 || 20–15–4 || 44 || 
|- style="background:#cfc;"
| 40 || January 8 || Philadelphia || 4–1 || Atlanta || || Niittymaki || 13,047 || 21–15–4 || 46 || 
|- style="background:#cfc;"
| 41 || January 10 || Philadelphia || 6–2 || NY Rangers || || Niittymaki || 18,200 || 22–15–4 || 48 || 
|- style="background:#ffc;"
| 42 || January 12 || Boston || 4–3 || Philadelphia || OT || Niittymaki || 19,792 || 22–15–5 || 49 || 
|- style="background:#cfc;"
| 43 || January 13 || Philadelphia || 6–4 || Washington || || Biron || 17,713  || 23–15–5 || 51 || 
|- style="background:#cfc;"
| 44 || January 16 || Florida || 3–5 || Philadelphia || || Niittymaki || 19,207 || 24–15–5 || 53 || 
|- style="background:#cfc;"
| 45 || January 19 || Philadelphia || 5–3 || NY Islanders || || Biron || 16,234 || 25–15–5 || 55 || 
|- style="background:#cfc;"
| 46 || January 20 || Ottawa || 1–6 || Philadelphia || || Niittymaki || 19,742 || 26–15–5 || 57 || 
|- style="background:#fcf;"
| 47 || January 22 || New Jersey || 7–3 || Philadelphia || || Niittymaki || 19,677 || 26–16–5 || 57 || 
|- style="background:#cfc;"
| 48 || January 24 || Pittsburgh || 3–4 || Philadelphia || || Biron ||  19,807 || 27–16–5 || 59 || 
|- style="background:#cfc;"
| 49 || January 29 || Los Angeles || 2–3 || Philadelphia || OT || Biron || 19,127 || 28–16–5 || 61 || 
|- style="background:#fcf;"
| 50 || January 31 || NY Rangers || 4–0 || Philadelphia || || Niittymaki || 19,670 || 28–17–5 || 61 || 
|-

|- style="background:#cfc;"
| 51 || February 2 || Anaheim || 0–3 || Philadelphia || || Biron || 19,822 || 29–17–5 ||63 || 
|- style="background:#cfc;"
| 52 || February 5 || Philadelphia || 3–2 || Atlanta || || Niittymaki || 15,082 || 30–17–5 || 65 || 
|- style="background:#fcf;"
| 53 || February 6 || Washington || 4–3 || Philadelphia || || Biron || 19,778 || 30–18–5|| 65 || 
|- style="background:#fcf;"
| 54 || February 9 || NY Rangers || 2–0 || Philadelphia || || Biron || 19,862 || 30–19–5 || 65 || 
|- style="background:#fcf;"
| 55 || February 10 || Philadelphia || 3–4 || Pittsburgh || || Biron || 17,132 || 30–20–5|| 65 || 
|- style="background:#fcf;"
| 56 || February 12 || Philadelphia || 3–4 || NY Islanders || || Niittymaki || 11,193 || 30–21–5|| 65 || 
|- style="background:#fcf;"
| 57 || February 14 || Tampa Bay || 5–3 || Philadelphia || || Biron || 19,336 || 30–22–5 || 65 || 
|- style="background:#fcf;"
| 58 || February 16 || Philadelphia || 0–1 || Montreal || || Niittymaki || 21,273 || 30–23–5 || 65 || 
|- style="background:#fcf;"
| 59 || February 17 || Montreal || 5–3 || Philadelphia || || Niitymaki  || 19,611 || 30–24–5 || 65 || 
|- style="background:#ffc;"
| 60 || February 19 || Philadelphia || 2–3 || Ottawa || SO || Biron || 19,729 || 30–24–6 || 66 || 
|- style="background:#fcf;"
| 61 || February 21 || San Jose || 3–1 || Philadelphia || || Biron || 19,487 || 30–25–6 || 66 || 
|- style="background:#ffc;"
| 62 || February 23 || Florida || 2–1 || Philadelphia || OT || Niitymaki || 19,629 || 30–25–7 || 67 || 
|- style="background:#cfc;"
| 63 || February 25 || Philadelphia || 4–3 || Buffalo || SO || Biron || 18,690 || 31–25–7 || 69 || 
|- style="background:#cfc;"
| 64 || February 28 || Ottawa || 1–3 || Philadelphia || || Biron || 19,567 || 32–25–7 || 71 || 
|-

|- style="background:#cfc;"
| 65 || March 1 || Philadelphia || 4–1 || NY Islanders || || Biron || 15,136 || 33–25–7 || 73 || 
|- style="background:#ffc;"
| 66 || March 2 || Philadelphia || 4–5 || NY Rangers || SO || Biron ||   18,200 || 33–25–8 || 74 || 
|- style="background:#fcf;"
| 67 || March 4 || Buffalo ||5–2  || Philadelphia || ||Biron || 19,516 || 33–26–8 || 74 || 
|- style="background:#cfc;"
| 68 || March 6 || Tampa Bay || 2–3 || Philadelphia ||  || Biron  || 19,217 || 34–26–8 || 76 || 
|- style="background:#cfc;"
| 69 || March 8 || NY Islanders || 1–4 || Philadelphia || ||Biron || 19,748 ||35–26–8 || 78 || 
|- style="background:#ffc;"
| 70 || March 11 || Philadelphia || 3–4 || Toronto || OT ||Biron || 19,507|| 35–26–9 || 79 || 
|- style="background:#fcf;"
| 71 || March 12 || Toronto ||3–2 || Philadelphia || ||Biron||19,642 ||35–27–9 ||79 || 
|- style="background:#ffc;"
| 72 || March 15 || Philadelphia ||2–3 || Boston || OT||Biron ||17,565 ||35–27–10 ||80 || 
|- style="background:#fcf;"
| 73 || March 16 || Philadelphia ||1–7 || Pittsburgh || ||Biron ||17,132 || 35–28–10 || 80 || 
|- style="background:#cfc;"
| 74 || March 18 || Atlanta ||2–3 || Philadelphia || ||Niittymaki ||19,564 ||36–28–10 || 82 || 
|- style="background:#cfc;"
| 75 || March 21 || NY Rangers ||3–4 || Philadelphia ||SO ||Biron||19,819 ||37–28–10 ||84 || 
|- style="background:#cfc;"
| 76 || March 23 || NY Islanders ||1–4 || Philadelphia || || Biron || 19,136 || 38–28–10 || 86 || 
|- style="background:#cfc;"
| 77 || March 25 || Philadelphia ||2–1 || NY Rangers || OT || Biron || 18,200||39–28–10 || 88 || 
|- style="background:#ffc;"
| 78 || March 28 || Philadelphia ||4–5 || New Jersey || SO || Biron || 17,056||  39–28–11|| 89 || 
|- style="background:#cfc;"
| 79 || March 29 || Philadelphia ||4–3 || NY Islanders || SO || Niittymaki || 15,223 || 40–28–11|| 91 || 
|-

|- style="background:#fcf;"
| 80 || April 2 || Philadelphia ||2–4 || Pittsburgh || ||Biron ||17,132 ||40–29–11 ||91 || 
|- style="background:#cfc;"
| 81 || April 4 || New Jersey ||0–3 || Philadelphia || || Biron || 19,957 || 41–29–11 || 93 || 
|- style="background:#cfc;"
| 82 || April 6 || Pittsburgh ||0–2 || Philadelphia || || Biron || 19,767 || 42–29–11 || 95 || 
|-

|-
|Legend:

Playoffs

|- style="background:#fcf;"
| 1 || April 11 || Philadelphia || 4–5 || Washington ||  || Biron || 18,277 || Capitals lead 1–0 || 
|- style="background:#cfc;"
| 2 || April 13 || Philadelphia || 2–0 || Washington ||  || Biron || 18,277 || Series tied 1–1 || 
|- style="background:#cfc;"
| 3 || April 15 || Washington || 3–6 || Philadelphia ||  || Biron || 19,822 || Flyers lead 2–1 || 
|- style="background:#cfc;"
| 4 || April 17 || Washington || 3–4 || Philadelphia || 2OT || Biron || 19,913 || Flyers lead 3–1 || 
|- style="background:#fcf;"
| 5 || April 19 || Philadelphia || 2–3 || Washington ||  || Biron || 18,277 || Flyers lead 3–2 || 
|- style="background:#fcf;"
| 6 || April 21 || Washington || 4–2 || Philadelphia ||  || Biron || 19,927 || Series tied 3–3 || 
|- style="background:#cfc;"
| 7 || April 22 || Philadelphia || 3–2 || Washington || OT || Biron || 18,277 || Flyers win 4–3 || 
|-

|- style="background:#fcf;"
| 1 || April 24 || Philadelphia || 3–4 || Montreal || OT || Biron || 21,273 || Canadiens lead 1–0 || 
|- style="background:#cfc;"
| 2 || April 26 || Philadelphia || 4–2 || Montreal ||  || Biron || 21,273 || Series tied 1–1 || 
|- style="background:#cfc;"
| 3 || April 28 || Montreal || 2–3 || Philadelphia ||  || Biron || 19,849 || Flyers lead 2–1 || 
|- style="background:#cfc;"
| 4 || April 30 || Montreal || 2–4 || Philadelphia ||  || Biron || 19,872 || Flyers lead 3–1 || 
|- style="background:#cfc;"
| 5 || May 3 || Philadelphia || 6–4 || Montreal || || Biron || 21,273 || Flyers win 4–1 || 
|-

|- style="background:#fcf;"
| 1 || May 9 || Philadelphia || 2–4 || Pittsburgh ||  || Biron || 17,132 || Penguins lead 1–0 || 
|- style="background:#fcf;"
| 2 || May 11 || Philadelphia || 2–4 || Pittsburgh ||  || Biron || 17,132 || Penguins lead 2–0 || 
|- style="background:#fcf;"
| 3 || May 13 || Pittsburgh || 4–1 || Philadelphia ||  || Biron || 19,965 || Penguins lead 3–0 || 
|- style="background:#cfc;"
| 4 || May 15 || Pittsburgh || 2–4 || Philadelphia ||  || Biron || 19,972 || Penguins lead 3–1 || 
|- style="background:#fcf;"
| 5 || May 18 || Philadelphia || 0–6  || Pittsburgh ||  || Biron  || 17,132 || Penguins win 4–1 || 
|-

|-
|Legend:

Player statistics

Scoring
 Position abbreviations: C = Center; D = Defense; G = Goaltender; LW = Left Wing; RW = Right Wing
  = Joined team via a transaction (e.g., trade, waivers, signing) during the season. Stats reflect time with the Flyers only.
  = Left team via a transaction (e.g., trade, waivers, release) during the season. Stats reflect time with the Flyers only.

Goaltending

Awards and records

Awards

Records

Among the team records set during the 2007–08 season was Danny Briere tying the team record for most goals scored in a single period (3) on November 21. In a 3–2 win against the Toronto Maple Leafs on January 5, goaltender Antero Niittymaki made 54 saves on 56 shots against, both team single game records. On January 19, Scott Hartnell scored three powerplay goals, tying the Flyers single game record.

Milestones

Transactions
The Flyers were involved in the following transactions from June 7, 2007, the day after the deciding game of the 2007 Stanley Cup Finals, through June 4, 2008, the day of the deciding game of the 2008 Stanley Cup Finals.

Trades

Players acquired

Players lost

Signings

Draft picks

Philadelphia's picks at the 2007 NHL Entry Draft, which was held at Nationwide Arena in Columbus, Ohio on June 22–23, 2007. The Flyers traded their original second, third, and fourth-round picks in three different trades.

Farm teams
The Flyers were affiliated with the Philadelphia Phantoms of the AHL and the Wheeling Nailers of the ECHL. The Phantoms, with Craig Berube returning as head coach, finished second in their division and won their first round playoff series against the Albany River Rats in seven games. They lost in the second round to the Wilkes-Barre/Scranton Penguins in five games. In their first and only season as the Flyers ECHL affiliate, the Nailers finished last in their division and missed the playoffs.

Notes

References
General
 
 
 
Specific

External links
 Philadelphia Flyers Historical Salaries from CapGeek.com

2007-08
2007–08 NHL season by team
Phil
Philadelphia
Philadelphia